The pentathlon or women's pentathlon is a combined track and field event in which each woman competes in five separate events over one day (formerly two days). The distance or time for each event is converted to points via scoring tables, with the overall ranking determined by total points. Since 1949 the events have been sprint hurdling, high jump, shot put, long jump, and a flat race. The sprint hurdles distance was 80 m outdoors until 1969 and thereafter 100 m; in indoor pentathlon the distance is 60 m. The flat race was 200 m until 1976 and thereafter 800 m.  In elite-level outdoor competition, the pentathlon was superseded in 1981 by the heptathlon, which has seven events, with both 200 m and 800 m, as well as the javelin throw. Pentathlon is still contested at school and masters level and indoors.

History

The word pentathlon is derived from the Greek pente (five) and athlon (contest).  The ancient Olympic pentathlon comprised a sprint, the javelin and discus throws, long jump, and wrestling. The modern pentathlon is a multi-sport event. In men's track and field,  pentathlon competitions were held in the 20th century, but the ten-event decathlon became the standard multi-event contest.  

The International Women's Sports Federation was established in 1921 and the first reported pentathlon was in the 1922 Women's Olympiad in Monte Carlo. The events were: 60 m, 300 m, high jump, two-hand javelin, and two-hand shot. In the late 1920s, the events were: shot and long jump on the first day, and 100 m, high jump, and javelin on the second day. The first world record recognised by the IAAF was set at the 1934 Women's World Games by Gisela Mauermayer. 

From 1949 the events were: shot, high jump, and 200 m on the first day; 80 m hurdles and long jump on the second. The scoring tables were changed in 1954, and again in 1971. In 1961, the order of the events was changed to: 80 m hurdles, shot, and high jump on the first day; long jump and 200 m on the second, in 1971 the 80 m hurdles were changed to 100 m hurdles. From 1977 all were contested in a single day.  Pentathlon was contested at the European Athletics Championships from 1950 to 1978, and at the Olympics from 1964 until 1980. The IAAF has not ratified world records in outdoor pentathlon since replacing it in 1981 with the heptathlon.

Indoors

The pentathlon is still held indoors, where the heptathlon cannot be held as arenas are too small for the javelin throw. It was added to the IAAF World Indoor Championships as an unofficial event in 1993 and officially in 1995. The indoor pentathlon is held over a one-day period. Each athlete completes one event at the same time, then there is a 30-minute break until the next event. The current world record is 5055 points by Nafissatou Thiam at the 2023 European Athletics Indoor Championships.

All-time top 25
(60 m hurdles, high jump, shot put, long jump, 800m)
Correct as of March 2023.

Notes
Below is a list of scores equal or superior to 4775 pts:
Katarina Johnson-Thompson also scored 4983 (2019).
Carolina Klüft also scored 4944 (2007), 4933 (2003).
Jessica Ennis-Hill also scored 4937 (2010).
Nafissatou Thiam also scored 4904 (2021), 4870 (2017).
Natallia Dobrynska also scored 4880 (2012).
Tia Hellebaut also scored 4867 (2008).
Adrianna Sułek also scored 4860 (2023), 4851 (2022).
Noor Vidts also scored 4823 (2023).

Annulled marks
Tatyana Chernova of Russia's score of 4855 pts was annulled due to doping offence.
Anastasiya Mokhnyuk of Ukraine's score of 4847 pts was annulled due to doping offence.

World record progression

World records (WR) compared to Pentathlon Bests (PB)

Olympic medalists

World Indoor Championships medalists

Season's bests

Contemporary outdoor pentathlon
As well as indoor events at all levels, outdoor pentathlon is still common in high school athletics. It is simply a smaller version of the decathlon or a heptathlon.  For girls, it is 100 m high hurdles, long jump, shot put, high jump, and an 800 m run. The pentathlon is used because it is less stressful on the athletes than a full multi and because many high school meets only last one day, it allows the event to be contested in the time limit.

See also

References

External links
 Women's indoor pentathlon rankings from IAAF
 IAAF list of Women's pentathlon records in XML
 Women, Pentathlon/Heptathlon Track and Field Statistics, including:

Pentathlon
Women
Pentathlon
Pentathlon
Pentathlon
Indoor track and field